Jiang Hualiang (10 January 1965 – 23 December 2022) was a Chinese pharmacist who served as director of the Shanghai Institute of Materia Medica, and an academician of the Chinese Academy of Sciences. 

Jiang was a member of the China Democratic League. He was a member of the 10th and 12th National Committee of the Chinese People's Political Consultative Conference.

Biography
Jiang was born in Wujin County (now Wujin District of Changzhou), Jiangsu, in January 1956, but was raised in Yixing. In 1983, he entered Nanjing University where he received his bachelor's degree in organic chemistry in 1987.

In 1995, Jiang began his academic career at the Shanghai Institute of Materia Medica. He moved up the ranks to become executive vice director in December 2004 and director in December 2013.

On 23 December 2022, Jiang died in Shanghai, at the age of 57.

Honours and awards
 2007 State Natural Science Award (Second Class)
 2007 Science and Technology Progress Award of the Ho Leung Ho Lee Foundation
 2017 Member of the Chinese Academy of Sciences (CAS)
 2017 State Technological Invention Award (Second Class)

References

1956 births
2022 deaths
People from Changzhou
Scientists from Jiangsu
Nanjing University alumni
East China Normal University alumni
Members of the Chinese Academy of Sciences
Members of the China Democratic League
Members of the 10th Chinese People's Political Consultative Conference
Members of the 11th Chinese People's Political Consultative Conference
Members of the 12th Chinese People's Political Consultative Conference
20th-century Chinese scientists
21st-century Chinese scientists